Clayton Municipal Airpark  is a town owned, public use airport located two nautical miles (4 km) east of the central business district of Clayton, a town in Union County, New Mexico, United States. It is included in the National Plan of Integrated Airport Systems for 2011–2015, which categorized it as a general aviation facility.

Facilities and aircraft 
Clayton Municipal Airpark covers an area of 755 acres (306 ha) at an elevation of 4,970 feet (1,515 m) above mean sea level. It has two runways with asphalt surfaces: 2/20 is 6,307 by 75 feet (1,922 x 23 m); and 12/30 is 4,106 by 60 feet (1,252 x 18 m).

For the 12-month period ending May 2, 2010, the airport had 3,500 aircraft operations, an average of 291 per month: 94% general aviation and 6% military. At that time there were 11 aircraft based at this airport: 91% single-engine and 9% ultralight.

References

External links 
 Aerial image as of March 1997 from USGS The National Map
 

Airports in New Mexico
Transportation in Union County, New Mexico
Buildings and structures in Union County, New Mexico